Oncostemum are a genus of flowering plants in the family Primulaceae, native to the Comoros and Madagascar. The Mascarene Islands endemic genus Badula appears to nest inside Oncostemum.

Species
Currently accepted species include:

Oncostemum acuminatum Mez
Oncostemum andreanae H.Perrier
Oncostemum ankifiense Mez
Oncostemum arboreum H.Perrier
Oncostemum arthriticum Baker
Oncostemum balanocarpum Mez
Oncostemum barbeyanum Mez
Oncostemum boivinianum H.Perrier
Oncostemum bojerianum A.DC.
Oncostemum botryoides Baker
Oncostemum brevipedatum Mez
Oncostemum buxifolium H.Perrier
Oncostemum capelieranum A.Juss.
Oncostemum capitatum H.Perrier
Oncostemum cauliflorum H.Perrier
Oncostemum celastroides H.Perrier
Oncostemum commersonianum A.Juss.
Oncostemum coriaceum H.Perrier
Oncostemum coursii H.Perrier
Oncostemum crenatum Mez
Oncostemum dauphinense H.Perrier
Oncostemum denticulatum H.Perrier
Oncostemum divaricatum A.DC.
Oncostemum dracaenifolium H.Perrier
Oncostemum elephantipes H.Perrier
Oncostemum ericophilum H.Perrier
Oncostemum evonymoides Mez
Oncostemum falcifolium Mez
Oncostemum filicinum Mez
Oncostemum flexuosum Baker
Oncostemum formosum H.Perrier
Oncostemum forsythii Mez
Oncostemum fuscopilosum (Baker) Mez
Oncostemum glaucum H.Perrier
Oncostemum goudotianum A.DC.
Oncostemum gracile Mez
Oncostemum gracilipes H.Perrier
Oncostemum hieroglyforme H.Perrier
Oncostemum hildebrandtii Mez
Oncostemum hirsutum H.Perrier
Oncostemum humbertianum H.Perrier
Oncostemum humblotii Mez
Oncostemum imparipinnatum H.Perrier
Oncostemum laevigatum Mez
Oncostemum laurifolium (Bojer ex A.DC.) Mez
Oncostemum laxiflorum Mez
Oncostemum leprosum Mez
Oncostemum leptocladum (Baker) Mez
Oncostemum lichenophilum H.Perrier
Oncostemum linearisepalum H.Perrier
Oncostemum longipes (Baker) Mez
Oncostemum lucens H.Perrier
Oncostemum macranthum H.Perrier
Oncostemum macrocarpum H.Perrier
Oncostemum macrophyllum Mez
Oncostemum macroscyphon (Baker) Mez
Oncostemum macrostachyum Mez
Oncostemum matitanense H.Perrier
Oncostemum meeusianum H.Perrier
Oncostemum mezianum H.Perrier
Oncostemum microphyllum (Roem. & Schult.) Mez
Oncostemum microsphaerum Baker
Oncostemum musicola H.Perrier
Oncostemum myrtilloides H.Perrier
Oncostemum nemorosum A.DC.
Oncostemum neriifolium Baker
Oncostemum nervosum Baker
Oncostemum nitidulum (Baker) Mez
Oncostemum oliganthum (Baker) Mez
Oncostemum ovatoacuminatum H.Perrier
Oncostemum pachybotrys Mez
Oncostemum palmiforme H.Perrier
Oncostemum paniculatum H.Perrier
Oncostemum pauciflorum A.DC.
Oncostemum pendulum Mez
Oncostemum pentagonum H.Perrier
Oncostemum phyllarthoides Baker
Oncostemum platycladum Baker
Oncostemum polytrichum Baker
Oncostemum pterocaule Mez
Oncostemum pustulosum H.Perrier
Oncostemum racemiferum Mez
Oncostemum radlkoferi Mez
Oncostemum reflexum Mez
Oncostemum richardianum H.Perrier
Oncostemum ricnanense H.Perrier
Oncostemum roseum Aug.DC.
Oncostemum rubricaule H.Perrier
Oncostemum rubronotatum H.Perrier
Oncostemum scabridum Mez
Oncostemum scriptum H.Perrier
Oncostemum seyrigii H.Perrier
Oncostemum subcuspidatum H.Perrier
Oncostemum tenerum Mez
Oncostemum terniflorum H.Perrier
Oncostemum triflorum H.Perrier
Oncostemum umbellatum Mez
Oncostemum vacciniifolium Baker
Oncostemum venulosum Baker
Oncostemum viride H.Perrier

References

Primulaceae
Primulaceae genera